State Route 58 (SR 58) is a north–south state highway in northern Ohio maintained by the Ohio Department of Transportation (ODOT). The  that make up SR 58 serve the cities of Ashland, Wellington, Oberlin, Amherst, and Lorain in Ashland and Lorain Counties. Its southern terminus is at US 250 in Ashland, and its northern terminus is at US 6 in Lorain.

History
Part of the highway now SR 58 has been a state highway since the creation of the system in 1912. SR 144 followed the modern-day SR 58 between downtown Ashland and Oberlin. In 1923, SR 58 was assigned to what is now the entire length of SR 89 and the current SR 58 from Sullivan to Oberlin. The remainder of the current route was designated SR SR 96. By 1927, SR 58 was routed into downtown Ashland. In 1930, it was extended north to its current end in Lorain at what was at the time designated SR 2. The only major change to the routing occurred around 1995 when the southern terminus was moved to the US 250 bypass north of Downtown Ashland.

Major junctions

References

058
Transportation in Ashland County, Ohio
Transportation in Lorain County, Ohio
Lorain, Ohio